The Aerotique Parasol is an American parasol-wing, strut-braced, conventional landing gear, single-seat, open cockpit, single engine in tractor configuration, ultralight aircraft that was designed as an ultralight version of the 1926 vintage Heath Parasol. It was originally produced by Yesteryear Aviation and later by Aerotique Aviation. The aircraft was supplied as factory-built only.

Design and development

The aircraft's fuselage is built with an aluminium tube structure, with wooden wings, all covered with doped aircraft fabric covering. Early production models used wooden wing ribs, while later models transitioned to aluminium ribs. Its  span wing uses parallel lift struts supported by jury struts and flying wires. The wings are removable for transportation or storage and take about an hour to remove. Other than the engine and the wheels, all parts are certified aircraft parts.

The Parasol has conventional three-axis controls, including half-span ailerons. The main landing gear is bungee-suspended and the tail has a steerable skid. Brakes were optional and taxiing the aircraft without them was described as "a little tricky".

As is the case with many parasol designs where the pilot sits directly underneath the wing on the aircraft's center of gravity, the cockpit access is restricted by the close proximity of the wing.

Specifications (Parasol)

See also

References

1980s United States ultralight aircraft
Parasol-wing aircraft